

Aces 

</onlyinclude>
</onlyinclude>
</onlyinclude>

Notes

References 

Victories, 20